This article is a list of Serie B champions and promotions since its establishment – including the competition under previous names.

Promotions by season 

Italics denotes teams promoted after playoff or qualification match.
Parentheses denote teams not promoted.

Seconda Divisione

Prima Divisione

Serie B

Footnotes

References

Serie B
champions and promotions